Sanele Sydow (born 1999) better known by his stage name WizTheMc, is a South African–German Rapper, record producer and songwriter based in Toronto, Canada. He is best known for his 2020 breakout single "For A Minute", which has over 60 million streams on Spotify. Since 2018, he has released 3 albums, 8 EPs, 1 compilation and over a dozen singles and has toured across Europe, United States and Canada with artistes like Asap Rocky, Half Alive, Billie Eilish, Burna Boy, Future, Miley Cyrus, Skip marley, and Alan Walker.

Early life 
Sanele Sydow was born in 1999 in Cape Town, South Africa. At the age of 2 his family immigrated to Lüneburg, Germany where he grew up.

Career 
In 2015 Sanele Sydow and his friends formed a musical collective "NO HOMES" in Germany. The group was active for 2 years before they separated. In 2017 Sanele moved to Toronto to pursue a solo music career where he started writing songs and freestyling in his room.

In 2018 Sanele released "Backin Toronto" his debut album and "Blessings in Disguise", his second studio album released the same year. He would go on and released multiple singles including his breakout single "For A Minute" which has been featured on Grey's Anatomy, Facebook messenger and Netflix 2021 movie He's All That. His 3rd studio album "Growing Teeth" was released in January 2020.

Discography

Albums

EPs

Compilations

Singles

Tours and festivals

Tours

Supporting 
 The Troubadour ( (2022)

 Half.Alive (2023)

Festivals 

 Osheaga Festival  (2022)

References

External links 

 WizTheMc at AllMusic

Living people
1990 births
German rappers
South African musicians
Canadian people of South African descent
German people of South African descent
Canadian rappers